Sng Ju Wei (born 3 June 1980) is a Singaporean former swimmer, who specialized in sprint and middle-distance freestyle events. He is a two-time Olympian (1996 and 2000), and a triple medalist at the 2001 Southeast Asian Games. Sng also trained for the Aquatic Performance Swim Club in Singapore district, under head coach Jin Xia Li.

Sng made his Olympic debut, as a 16-year-old from Singapore, at the 1996 Summer Olympics in Atlanta. He failed to reach the top 16 final in any of his individual events, finishing fifty-eighth in the 50 m freestyle (25.04), fifty-seventh in the 100 m freestyle (53.50), thirty-seventh in the 200 m freestyle (1:55.51), and thirty-third in the 400 m freestyle (4:12.24). As a member of the Singaporean squad, Sng also placed fifteenth in the 4×200 m freestyle relay (7:54.19), and twenty-third in the 4×100 m medley relay (3:59.51), along with his teammates Desmond Koh, Gerald Koh, and Thum Ping Tjin.

At the 2000 Summer Olympics in Sydney, Sng drastically shortened his program, swimming only in the 400 m freestyle on the first day of the Games. He posted a FINA B-standard of 4:04.55 from the Southeast Asian Games in Brunei. He established a Singaporean record of 4:01.34 to hit the wall first in heat one, holding off Chile's Giancarlo Zolezzi by 0.17 of a second. Sng failed to reach the top 8 final, as he placed thirty-seventh overall in the prelims.

At the 2001 Southeast Asian Games in Kuala Lumpur, Malaysia, Sng won a total of three medals: two golds in the 4×100 m freestyle relay (3:27.48) and 4×200 m freestyle relay (7:38.82), and bronze in the 200 m freestyle (1:54.33).

References

External links
 
Profile – Singapore Swimming Association

1980 births
Living people
Singaporean male freestyle swimmers
Olympic swimmers of Singapore
Swimmers at the 1996 Summer Olympics
Swimmers at the 2000 Summer Olympics
Swimmers at the 1994 Asian Games
Swimmers at the 1998 Asian Games
Swimmers at the 2006 Asian Games
Southeast Asian Games medalists in swimming
Southeast Asian Games gold medalists for Singapore
Southeast Asian Games bronze medalists for Singapore
Competitors at the 2001 Southeast Asian Games
Asian Games competitors for Singapore
21st-century Singaporean people